Proparabosca is a genus of biting flies in the family of louse flies, Hippoboscidae. There is only one known species, Proparabosca alata (Theodor & Oldroyd, 1965). It is a parasite of lemurs.

Distribution 
It is found in Namoroka National Park in Madagascar.

Hosts 
They are only found on Verreaux's sifaka (Propithecus verreauxi).

References 

Parasitic flies
Parasites of primates
Hippoboscidae
Hippoboscoidea genera
Monotypic Brachycera genera